A list of films produced in Italy in 1914 (see 1914 in film):

External links
 Italian films of 1914 at the Internet Movie Database

Italian
1914
Films